The 59 Division is an division of the Sri Lanka Army formed in 2007. A principal offensive division it is currently deployed for combat operations in the Mullaitivu region.

Sri Lankan Civil War

Operations
Formed in the Welioya sector it was tasked with advancing from Welioya to the LTTE stronghold of Mullaitivu. The division captured key LTTE bases in the jungles of Mullaitivu, these included Muhagam camp (May 30, 2008), Michael camp (May 30, 2008), Suganthan camp (July 27, 2008), Jeevan camp (August 16, 2008) that belong to the one four base complex. Troops of the 59 Division took western section of the Nayaru Lagoon on August 21, 2008 and on November 11 Kumalamunai was taken followed by Othiyamalai (November 29, 2008) and Mullayaveli (December 16, 2008)

The 59 Division participated in the Battle of Mullaitivu in January 2009, during which it captured Mullaitivu town, the last stronghold of the Tamil Tigers.

Towns liberated by 59 Division

Composition
59-1 Brigade 
1st Battalion, Sri Lanka Sinha Regiment
11th Gemunu Watch
14th Vjayabahu Infantry Battalion
59-2 Brigade
1st Sri Lanka Light Infantry
15th V Gemunu Watch
59-3 Brigade
15th Sri Lanka Light Infantry
9th Vjayabahu Infantry Battalion
7th Gemunu Watch

References

External links
Strength behind 59 Division

Sri Lanka Army divisions
Military units and formations established in 2007
2007 establishments in Sri Lanka